Kaxta is a Spanish rock band from Badajoz, Extremadura. The group consists of Isi, Pi, Kike, López and Rafa. The band was created in 2007 out of members from other bands from Extremadura such as Distrito Desperado, Veinte:30, Última Hora, Línea Mortal or Alergia.

History 

The band was founded in 2007 and hasn't stopped working ever since. A month after their official formation they recorded their first EP “La cuenta atrás” (The countdown). Kaxta started to play some live shows and continued to work until the band’s first album, named: “No soy un bicho raro” (I’m not a weirdo), produced by Álvaro Gandul and Pepe Bao came (pasado) out in 2009. Recognized musicians such as/like Manolo Chinato or Juanjo Pizarro collaborated on this first project.

One of their founding members, Martín, had to leave the band because of some personal problems and was replaced by Dani. Rafa Rodriguez (their sound technician) joined the band as their main guitarist to record their second album “Arremeto” (I lash out), released in 2011. They toured the country with this album.

Not only have they accomplished many things they've also been finalists in important competitions like “Antigua Rock”, “Perro Rock” and “el DycRectos”. Kaxta has also shared the stage with well-known groups such as Sinkope. 
After playing over 200 shows, the band got back in the studio in 2014 and released their latest album “Centro de Intoxicación” (Habilitation center).

They have been touring the country since 2008 and have been playing in a huge number of clubs in Spain. Also at important festivals as “Viña rock” or “Shikillo”.

Band members

Current 

Isidoro Gil " el Isi" (lead vocals and guitar)
Juan Carlos Preciado "el Pi" (bass guitar)
Rafael Rodriguez  (lead guitar)
Javi López  (rhythm guitar)
Kike Fernández  (drums)

Past 

Martín (drums)
Dani (drums)

Discography 

EP  La cuenta atrás (2007):
No se porke
Hechizo de luna
Ciudad infundada
La cuenta atrás

No soy un bicho raro (2009):
La ciudad de los vampiros
Agua pal sembrao
Cochambre
Ciudad infundada
No se porke
Hechizo de luna
Mar de refranes
Dulce locura
La cuenta atrás
Sabio del pastor

Arremeto (2011):
Bésame
Dame de mamar
Por las buenas o por las malas
No queda nada
Arremeto
Los pájaros de mi cabeza
En otra dirección
Salvaje y libre
Sudor y frio
Princesa
Y qué dirán las flores

Centro de Intoxicación (2014):
Dentro de mi
Nada me para
¡¡Explosión!!
Corazón
Malos pelos
Jícaras de chocolate
Centro de intoxicación
Efímero
Entre cuatro paredes

References

External links 
 Official website (Spanish)
 Twitter
 Facebook

Spanish rock music groups